The Sakarya (Sakara River, ; ; Hittite: Sehiriya; Latin: Sangarius) is the third longest river in Turkey. It runs through the region known in ancient times as Phrygia. It was considered one of the principal rivers of Asia Minor (Anatolia) in classical antiquity, and is mentioned in the Iliad and in Theogony. Its name appears in different forms as Sagraphos, Sangaris, or Sagaris. 

In Geographica, Strabo wrote during classical antiquity that the river had its sources on Mount Adoreus, near the town of Sangia in Phrygia, not far from the border with Galatia, and flowed in a very tortuous course: first in an eastern, then toward the north, next the north-west and finally  the north through Bithynia into the Euxine (Black Sea).

Part of its course formed the boundary between Phrygia and Bithynia, which in early times was bounded on the east by the river. The Bithynian part of the river was navigable and was celebrated for the abundance of fish found in it. Its principal tributaries were the Alander, the Bathys, the Thymbres and the Gallus.

The source of the river is the Bayat Yaylası (Bayat Plateau), which northeast of Afyon. Joined by the Porsuk Çayı (Porsuk Creek), close to the town of Polatlı, the river runs through the Adapazarı Ovası (Adapazarı Plains) before it reaches the Black Sea. The Sakarya was once crossed by the Sangarius Bridge, constructed by Eastern Roman Emperor Justinian I (r. 527–565).

In the 13th century, the valley of the Sakarya was part of the border between the Eastern Roman Empire and the home of the Söğüt tribe. By 1280, Emperor Michael VIII Palaiologos had constructed a series of fortifications along the river to control the area, but a flood in 1302 changed the course of the river and made the fortifications useless. The Söğüt tribe migrated across the river and later established the Ottoman Empire.

From downstream to upstream, the Sakarya has four dams: Akçay, Yenice, Gökçekaya and Sarıyar.

References

See also
 Battle of Sakarya
 Sakarya Province
 Sangarius Bridge
 Nana (Greek mythology)

Rivers of Turkey
Landforms of Ankara Province
Landforms of Eskişehir Province
Landforms of Sakarya Province
Landforms of Bilecik Province
Locations in the Iliad